The 1994 Little League World Series took place between August 22 and August 27 in Williamsport, Pennsylvania. The Coquivacoa Little League of Maracaibo, Venezuela, defeated the Northridge Little League team of Northridge, California, in the championship game of the 48th Little League World Series.

Teams

Pool play

Elimination round

Notable players
Matt Cassel (Northridge, California) – NFL quarterback
Guillermo Quiróz (Maracaibo, Venezuela) – MLB catcher
Krissy Wendell-Pohl (Brooklyn Center, Minnesota) – Olympic hockey player; inducted to the Little League Hall of Excellence in 2004.

References

External links

Little League World Series
Little League World Series
Little League World Series
Little League World Series